Zambia National Commercial Bank, commonly referred to by the name "Zanaco", is a commercial bank in Zambia. It is licensed by Bank of Zambia, the central bank and national banking regulator. In 2021, Zanaco became the first bank in Zambia to register ZMW1bn in profit after tax.

Location
The bank's headquarters and main branch are located in Zanaco House, at the corner of Cairo Road and Chainda Place, in the central business district of Lusaka, the capital and largest city in Zambia. The address is 2118–2121 Cairo Road, Lusaka, Zambia. The coordinates of the bank's headquarters are: 15°25'25.0"S, 28°17'00.0"E (Latitude:-15.423611; Longitude:28.283333).

History
Zanaco was founded in 1969 by the Government of Zambia. Prior to 2007, the bank was 100 percent owned by the government. In that year, 49 percent of its shares were sold to the  Rabobank Group, a banking company from the Netherlands. In 2008, the shares of Zanaco were listed on the Lusaka Stock Exchange (LUSE), where they trade under the symbol: (ZANACO). According to the bank's quarterly financial statements as at 30 June 2022, net income was ZMW29.42m. The current shareholding in the bank is detailed under ownership.

Overview
Zanaco is one of the largest financial services provider in Zambia. , the bank's total assets were valued at ZMW26.18 billion (US$1.57 billion) with shareholders' equity of ZMW2.145 billion (US$128.76 million). In 2021, the Bank attained a historical milestone when it became the first Zambian Bank to record ZMW1 billion in profit after tax. The achievement was 
mainly attributed to accelerated revenue from initiatives from both funded and non-funded opportunities coupled with a successful realization of a cost containment framework.

In October 2022, the bank secured a US$ 50.0 million credit line with British International Investment Company for onward lending to the small and medium sized businesses and green financing.

Awards in 2021
The Bank received recognition from the following international awards:
 Euromoney Award as the Best Bank in Zambia 2021 for being an institution that demonstrated resilience and achieved excellent results amid the COVID- 19 pandemic.
 Global Finance award as the Best Bank in Zambia 2021.
 International Banker Award 2021 for the Best Commercial Bank and Best in Retail innovation.
 Citi Performance Excellence Award 2021 for the achievement of the highest rates of Straight-Through Processing (STP).
 Global Finance award 2021 for Best Trade Finance Provider.

Ownership
, the banks's stock was owned by the following corporate entities and individuals:

∗Arise BV is an investment company co-owned by Rabobank, Netherlands Development Finance Company and Norfund.

Branch Network
Zanaco's main branch is located at the bank's headquarters in Lusaka, Zambia's capital and largest city. , the bank had one of the largest distribution networks in the country with 61 branches and agencies and almost 200 automated teller machines, spread across the entire country. In addition, Zanaco has over 16,750 Zanaco Xpress agents, a  partnership which allows Zanaco customers to deposit and withdraw funds from their accounts in both rural and urban locales.

Community service
Zanaco is the sponsor of Zanaco FC, a football club based in Lusaka, the capital city of Zambia.

See also

 List of banks in Zambia
 Economy of Zambia

References

External links
 Website of Zambia National Commercial Bank

Banks of Zambia
Companies based in Lusaka
Banks established in 1969
1969 establishments in Zambia
Companies listed on Lusaka Stock Exchange